was an administrator and educator in Meiji period Japan.

Early life

Takamine was born to a samurai family in Aizuwakamatsu domain (present day Fukushima Prefecture) in 1854. After completing his studies in the feudal domain's school, Nisshinkan, he became a page to the daimyō Matsudaira Katamori from April 1868 to the surrender of the domain to imperial forces in the Boshin War in November that same year.

He was sentenced to confinement for a time in Tokyo, and was placed in the care of the Matsudaira clan of the Tanba-Kameyama Domain. As part of his studies, he entered the private school of Numa Morikazu, where he began to learn English. He soon attended Keiō-gijuku (A private school founded by Fukuzawa Yukichi, which grew into the modern-day Keio University) and received a scholarship to attend Oswego Normal School (present day SUNY Oswego), in New York in the United States from 1875–1878. He was fortunate to attend Oswego during the very height of its fame as a progressive and innovative institution for teacher education. Takamine interacted with Edward Austin Sheldon (the director of the school) and lived in the house of famed educator Johann Heinrich Hermann Krüsi (1817–1903).

During his time in the United States he also attended Anderson School of Natural History on Penikese Island during the summer of 1877 and spent one semester studying under Burt Wilder, a famous zoologist at Cornell University. He was the first Japanese (some believe to be the first Asian) to have a teaching credential.

Later career
After returning to Japan, Takamine worked as an assistant to American scientist Edward Sylvester Morse and accompanied him on a trek to the rugged areas of Hokkaidō which were occupied by the Ainu.

He eventually became the Vice Principal and Principal of the Tokyo Normal School/ Tokyo Higher Normal School (same school but the name was changed), Principal of the Tokyo Art School, and Tokyo Music School. He was also deeply involved in women's education and became the Principal of Tokyo Women's Higher Normal School.

Generally, he is remembered as the man who introduced Pestallozian teaching methods and philosophy to Japan due to his translation of James Johonnot's Principles and Practice of Teaching into Japanese as Kyoiku Shinron [the new theory of education] 1885. Other projects he focused on included Japan's Exhibit in the Columbian Exposition of 1893 and he was involved in the Japan–British Exhibition (1910). His legacy is mixed, as despite his attempts to implement the American model of education in Japan, in the end, the government adopted the more conservative, German model.

Takamine's son, Takamine Toshio (1885–1959), was a famous physicist who worked in the field of spectroscopy.

Selected works 

 Takamine Hideo, trans Kyōiku Shinron [The New Theory of Education] 1885
 Takamine Hideo and Iwakawa Tomotarō Dōbutsu Hikaku Kaibozu [Anatomical Charts of Comparative Zoology 4 vol] Tokyo: Fukyusha 1885
 Ministry of Education Beikoku Gakkōhō [the American School Systems] 1878 (In a letter to his mother Takamine mentions that he translated over 200 pages for this manual. His name does not appear in the text).
 Hideo Takamine "Address at Tokyo Normal School", Tokyo Meikeikai Zasshi No. 14 (March 1884) pp. 9–21 recorded by Torasaburo Wakabayashi faithful student and colleague

Honors
 Order of the Rising Sun

References 

Ahagon, Chokusei. "The Influence of the Oswego Movement upon Japanese education, through Hideo Takamine in Early Meiji Japan 1860s–1880s" Phd Diss. State University of New York, Buffalo 1995
Ishikawa, H. (1902). Joshi Koto Shihan Gakko Kocho Takamine Hideo Kun (The Principal of the Woman's Senior Normal School, Mr Takamine Hideo). Kyoiku Kai, 1(11), 73. (In Japanese)
Japan's Modern Educational System: A History of the First Hundred Years Ministry of Education, Science and Culture
Anderson, Ronald S. Education in Japan: A Century of Modern Development Washington: U.S. Department of Health, Education and Welfare (U.S. Government Printing Office), 1975.
Beauchamp, Edward R. and Akira Iriye, ed. Foreign Employees in Nineteenth-Century Japan. London: Westview Press, 1990.
Johonnot, James. Principles and Practice of Teaching. New York: D. Appleton and Company, 1878.
Kaigo, Tokiomi . "The American Influence on the Education in Japan" Journal of Educational Sociology Vol. 26, No. 1 (Sep., 1952), pp. 9–15
Krüsi, Hermann. Recollections of my life, by Hermann Krüsi. An autobiographical sketch supplemented by extracts from his personal records and a review of his literary productions together with selected essays, arranged and ed. by Elizabeth Sheldon Alling. New York, The Grafton press [c1907]
Kuno, Akiko. translated by Kirsten McIvor. Unexpected Destinations: The Poignant Story of Japan's First Vassar Graduate. New York: Kodansha International, 1993.
Lincicome, Mark. Principle, Praxis, and the Politics of Educational Reform in Meiji Japan. Honolulu: University of Hawaii Press, 1995.

 Morse, Edward Sylvester. Japan Day by Day, 1877, 1878–79, 1882–83. Boston: Houghton Mifflin Company.  OCLC 412843
  Japan Day by Day, Vol. I.; Full View
  Japan Day by Day, Vol. II.; Full View
Nishihira, Isao. Western Influences of the Modernization of Japanese Education, 1868–1912. Phd Diss. 1972. Oswego State Normal School, e. HISTORICAL SKETCHES RELATING TO THE FIRST QUARTER CENTURY OF THE STATE NORMAL SCHOOL AND TRAINING SCHOOL AT OSWEGO NY B.J. Oliphant and Printer 1888.
_. History of the First Half Century of the Oswego State Normal and Training School at Oswego, NY The Radcliffe Press, 1913.
Rogers, Dorothy. Oswego: fountainhead of teacher education; a century in the Sheldon tradition. New York, Appleton-Century-Crofts [1961]
Straight, Willard Dickerman, 1880–1918. The Willard Straight papers at Cornell University. Ithaca, N.Y. : Photo Science of Cornell University, 1973. 12 reels ; 35 mm. (reels 1, 8, 9 and 12)
Wayman, Dorothy G. Edward Sylvester Morse: A Biography Cambridge Massachusetts Harvard Univ. Press 1942

External links 

TakamineHideo.net

Meiji Restoration
Samurai
1854 births
1910 deaths
Japanese educators
Japanese pages
People from Aizu
Aizu-Matsudaira retainers
Recipients of the Order of the Rising Sun